Giovanni Lorenzo Lulier, nicknamed Giovannino del Violone (Little John of the Violone) (c. 1662 – 29 March 1700) was a Baroque Italian composer, cellist and trombone player of Spanish descent.

Life
Lulier was born and died in Rome.  He was a student of Pietro Simone Agostini, a composer and violin virtuoso in the service of Pietro Ottoboni. From 1676 to 1699 Lulier played regularly in the Roman church of San Luigi dei Francesi; on 13 October 1679 he entered the Congregazione di Santa Cecilia. From 1681 he was active in the service of Benedetto Pamphili and from 1688 he played the trombone in the Musici del Campidoglio. When Pamphili left Rome in 1690, Lulier again became the protégé of cardinal Ottoboni and remained so for the rest of his life. In the 1690s he also worked for the Borghese family, and probably played the cello in the orchestra in which another Pamphili protégé, Arcangelo Corelli, was principal violinist.

Some works for cello by Lulier have survived, and also a number of vocal works with concertate cello parts. His compositions include cantatas and a number of oratorios.

Footnotes

References
 Julie Anne Sadie, Companion to Baroque Music, University of California Press, 1998. .
 George J Buelow, A History of Baroque Music, Indiana University Press, 2004. .

1660s births
1700 deaths
Italian Roman Catholics
Italian classical cellists
Italian male classical composers
Italian classical trombonists
Italian Baroque composers
17th-century Italian composers
17th-century male musicians